Trophic cascades are powerful indirect interactions that can control entire ecosystems, occurring when a trophic level in a food web is suppressed. For example, a top-down cascade will occur if predators are effective enough in predation to reduce the abundance, or alter the behavior of their prey, thereby releasing the next lower trophic level from predation (or herbivory if the intermediate trophic level is a herbivore).

The trophic cascade is an ecological concept which has stimulated new research in many areas of ecology. For example, it can be important for understanding the knock-on effects of removing top predators from food webs, as humans have done in many places through hunting and fishing.

A top-down cascade is a trophic cascade where the top consumer/predator controls the primary consumer population. In turn, the primary producer population thrives. The removal of the top predator can alter the food web dynamics. In this case, the primary consumers would overpopulate and exploit the primary producers. Eventually there would not be enough primary producers to sustain the consumer population. Top-down food web stability depends on competition and predation in the higher trophic levels. Invasive species can also alter this cascade by removing or becoming a top predator. This interaction may not always be negative. Studies have shown that certain invasive species have begun to shift cascades; and as a consequence, ecosystem degradation has been repaired.

For example, if the abundance of large piscivorous fish is increased in a lake, the abundance of their prey, smaller fish that eat zooplankton, should decrease. The resulting increase in zooplankton should, in turn, cause the biomass of its prey, phytoplankton, to decrease.

In a bottom-up cascade, the population of primary producers will always control the increase/decrease of the energy in the higher trophic levels. Primary producers are plants and phytoplankton that require photosynthesis. Although light is important, primary producer populations are altered by the amount of nutrients in the system. This food web relies on the availability and limitation of resources. All populations will experience growth if there is initially a large amount of nutrients.

In a subsidy cascade, species populations at one trophic level can be supplemented by external food. For example, native animals can forage on resources that don't originate in their same habitat, such as native predators eating livestock. This may increase their local abundances thereby affecting other species in the ecosystem and causing an ecological cascade. For example, Luskin et al. (2017) found that native animals living in protected primary rainforest in Malaysia found food subsidies in neighboring oil palm plantations. This subsidy allowed native animal populations to increase, which then triggered powerful secondary ‘cascading’ effects on forest tree community. Specifically, crop-raiding wild boar (Sus scrofa) built thousands of nests from the forest understory vegetation and this caused a 62% decline in forest tree sapling density over a 24-year study period. Such cross-boundary subsidy cascades may be widespread in both terrestrial and marine ecosystems and present significant conservation challenges.

These trophic interactions shape patterns of biodiversity globally. Humans and climate change have affected these cascades drastically. One example can be seen with sea otters (Enhydra lutris) on the Pacific coast of the United States of America. Over time, human interactions caused a removal of sea otters. One of their main prey, the pacific purple sea urchin (Strongylocentrotus purpuratus) eventually began to overpopulate. The overpopulation caused increased predation of giant kelp (Macrocystis pyrifera). As a result, there was extreme deterioration of the kelp forests along the California coast. This is why it is important for countries to regulate marine and terrestrial ecosystems.

Predator-induced interactions could heavily influence the flux of atmospheric carbon if managed on a global scale.  For example, a study was conducted to determine the cost of potential stored carbon in living kelp biomass in sea otter (Enhydra lutris) enhanced ecosystems. The study valued the potential storage between $205 million and $408 million dollars (US) on the European Carbon Exchange (2012).

Origins and theory 
Aldo Leopold is generally credited with first describing the mechanism of a trophic cascade, based on his observations of overgrazing of mountain slopes by deer after human extermination of wolves. Nelson Hairston, Frederick E. Smith and Lawrence B. Slobodkin are generally credited with introducing the concept into scientific discourse, although they did not use the term either. Hairston, Smith and Slobodkin argued that predators reduce the abundance of herbivores, allowing plants to flourish. This is often referred to as the green world hypothesis. The green world hypothesis is credited with bringing attention to the role of top-down forces (e.g. predation) and indirect effects in shaping ecological communities. The prevailing view of communities prior to Hairston, Smith and Slobodkin was trophodynamics, which attempted to explain the structure of communities using only bottom-up forces (e.g. resource limitation). Smith may have been inspired by the experiments of a Czech ecologist, Hrbáček, whom he met on a United States State Department cultural exchange. Hrbáček had shown that fish in artificial ponds reduced the abundance of zooplankton, leading to an increase in the abundance of phytoplankton.

Hairston, Smith and Slobodkin feuded that the ecological communities acted as food chains with three trophic levels. Subsequent models expanded the argument to food chains with more than or fewer than three trophic levels. Lauri Oksanen argued that the top trophic level in a food chain increases the abundance of producers in food chains with an odd number of trophic levels (such as in Hairston, Smith and Slobodkin's three trophic level model), but decreases the abundance of the producers in food chains with an even number of trophic levels. Additionally, he argued that the number of trophic levels in a food chain increases as the productivity of the ecosystem increases.

Criticisms 
Although the existence of trophic cascades is not controversial, ecologists have long debated how ubiquitous they are. Hairston, Smith and Slobodkin argued that terrestrial ecosystems, as a rule, behave as a three trophic level trophic cascade, which provoked immediate controversy. Some of the criticisms, both of Hairston, Smith and Slobodkin's model and of Oksanen's later model, were:
Plants possess numerous defenses against herbivory, and these defenses also contribute to reducing the impact of herbivores on plant populations.
Herbivore populations may be limited by factors other than food or predation, such as nesting sites or available territory.
For trophic cascades to be ubiquitous, communities must generally act as food chains, with discrete trophic levels. Most communities, however, have complex food webs. In real food webs, consumers often feed at multiple trophic levels (omnivory), organisms often change their diet as they grow larger, cannibalism occurs, and consumers are subsidized by inputs of resources from outside the local community, all of which blur the distinctions between trophic levels.

Antagonistically, this principle is sometimes called the "trophic trickle".

Classic examples 

Although Hairston, Smith and Slobodkin formulated their argument in terms of terrestrial food chains, the earliest empirical demonstrations of trophic cascades came from marine and, especially, aquatic ecosystems. Some of the most famous examples are:
 In North American lakes, piscivorous fish can dramatically reduce populations of zooplanktivorous fish; zooplanktivorous fish can dramatically alter freshwater zooplankton communities, and zooplankton grazing can in turn have large impacts on phytoplankton communities. Removal of piscivorous fish can change lake water from clear to green by allowing phytoplankton to flourish.
 In the Eel River, in Northern California, fish (steelhead and roach) consume fish larvae and predatory insects. These smaller predators prey on midge larvae, which feed on algae. Removal of the larger fish increases the abundance of algae.
 In Pacific kelp forests, sea otters feed on sea urchins. In areas where sea otters have been hunted to extinction, sea urchins increase in abundance and kelp populations are reduced.
 A classic example of a terrestrial trophic cascade is the reintroduction of gray wolves (Canis lupus) to Yellowstone National Park, which reduced the number, and changed the behavior, of elk (Cervus canadensis). This in turn released several plant species from grazing pressure and subsequently led to the transformation of riparian ecosystems. This example of a trophic cascade is vividly shown and explained in the viral video "How Wolves Change Rivers".

Terrestrial trophic cascades 
The fact that the earliest documented trophic cascades all occurred in lakes and streams led a scientist to speculate that fundamental differences between aquatic and terrestrial food webs made trophic cascades primarily an aquatic phenomenon. Trophic cascades were restricted to communities with relatively low species diversity, in which a small number of species could have overwhelming influence and the food web could operate as a linear food chain. Additionally, well documented trophic cascades at that point in time all occurred in food chains with algae as the primary producer. Trophic cascades, Strong argued, may only occur in communities with fast-growing producers which lack defenses against herbivory.

Subsequent research has documented trophic cascades in terrestrial ecosystems, including:
 In the coastal prairie of Northern California, yellow bush lupines are fed upon by a particularly destructive herbivore, the root-boring caterpillar of the ghost moth. Entomopathogenic nematodes kill the caterpillars, and can increase the survival and seed production of lupines.
 In Costa Rican rain forest, a Clerid beetle specializes in eating ants. The ant Pheidole bicornis has a mutualistic association with Piper plants: the ant lives on the Piper and removes caterpillars and other insect herbivores. The Clerid beetle, by reducing the abundance of ants, increases the leaf area removed from Piper plants by insect herbivores.

Critics pointed out that published terrestrial trophic cascades generally involved smaller subsets of the food web (often only a single plant species). This was quite different from aquatic trophic cascades, in which the biomass of producers as a whole were reduced when predators were removed. Additionally, most terrestrial trophic cascades did not demonstrate reduced plant biomass when predators were removed, but only increased plant damage from herbivores. It was unclear if such damage would actually result in reduced plant biomass or abundance. In 2002 a meta-analysis found trophic cascades to be generally weaker in terrestrial ecosystems, meaning that changes in predator biomass resulted in smaller changes in plant biomass. In contrast, a study published in 2009 demonstrated that multiple species of trees with highly varying autecologies are in fact heavily impacted by the loss of an apex predator. Another study, published in 2011, demonstrated that the loss of large terrestrial predators also significantly degrades the integrity of river and stream systems, impacting their morphology, hydrology, and associated biological communities.

The critics' model is challenged by studies accumulating since the reintroduction of gray wolves (Canis lupus) to Yellowstone National Park. The gray wolf, after being extirpated in the 1920s and absent for 70 years, was reintroduced to the park in 1995 and 1996. Since then a three-tiered trophic cascade has been reestablished involving wolves, elk (Cervus elaphus), and woody browse species such as aspen (Populus tremuloides), cottonwoods (Populus spp.), and willows (Salix spp.). Mechanisms likely include actual wolf predation of elk, which reduces their numbers, and the threat of predation, which alters elk behavior and feeding habits, resulting in these plant species being released from intensive browsing pressure. Subsequently, their survival and recruitment rates have significantly increased in some places within Yellowstone's northern range. This effect is particularly noted among the range's riparian plant communities, with upland communities only recently beginning to show similar signs of recovery.

Examples of this phenomenon include:

 A 2–3 fold increase in deciduous woody vegetation cover, mostly of willow, in the Soda Butte Creek area between 1995 and 1999.
 Heights of the tallest willows in the Gallatin River valley increasing from 75 cm to 200 cm between 1998 and 2002.
 Heights of the tallest willows in the Blacktail Creek area increased from less than 50 cm to more than 250 cm between 1997 and 2003. Additionally, canopy cover over streams increased significantly, from only 5% to a range of 14–73%.
 In the northern range, tall deciduous woody vegetation cover increased by 170% between 1991 and 2006.
 In the Lamar and Soda Butte Valleys the number of young cottonwood trees that had been successfully recruited went from 0 to 156 between 2001 and 2010.

Trophic cascades also impact the biodiversity of ecosystems, and when examined from that perspective wolves appear to be having multiple, positive cascading impacts on the biodiversity of Yellowstone National Park. These impacts include:

 Scavengers, such as ravens (Corvus corax), bald eagles (Haliaeetus leucocephalus), and even grizzly bears (Ursus arctos horribilis), are likely subsidized by the carcasses of wolf kills.
 In the northern range, the relative abundance of six out of seven native songbirds which utilize willow was found to be greater in areas of willow recovery as opposed to those where willows remained suppressed.
 Bison (Bison bison) numbers in the northern range have been steadily increasing as elk numbers have declined, presumably due to a decrease in interspecific competition between the two species.
 Importantly, the number of beaver (Castor canadensis) colonies in the park has increased from one in 1996 to twelve in 2009. The recovery is likely due to the increase in willow availability, as they have been feeding almost exclusively on it. As keystone species, the resurgence of beaver is a critical event for the region. The presence of beavers has been shown to positively impact streambank erosion,  sediment retention, water tables, nutrient cycling, and both the diversity and abundance of plant and animal life among riparian communities.

There are a number of other examples of trophic cascades involving large terrestrial mammals, including:

 In both Zion National Park and Yosemite National Park, the increase in human visitation during the first half of the 20th century was found to correspond to the decline of native cougar (Puma concolor) populations in at least part of their range. Soon after, native populations of mule deer (Odocoileus hemionus) erupted, subjecting resident communities of cottonwoods (Populus fremontii) in Zion and California black oak (Quercus kelloggii) in Yosemite to intensified browsing. This halted successful recruitment of these species except in refugia inaccessible to the deer. In Zion the suppression of cottonwoods increased stream erosion and decreased the diversity and abundance of amphibians, reptiles, butterflies, and wildflowers. In parts of the park where cougars were still common these negative impacts were not expressed and riparian communities were significantly healthier.
 In sub-Saharan Africa, the decline of lion (Panthera leo) and leopard (Panthera pardus) populations has led to a rising population of olive baboon (Papio anubis). This case of mesopredator release  negatively impacted already declining ungulate populations and is one of the reasons for increased conflict between baboons and humans, as the primates raid crops and spread intestinal parasites.
 In the Australian states of New South Wales and South Australia, the presence or absence of dingoes (Canis lupus dingo) was found to be inversely related to the abundance of invasive red foxes (Vulpes vulpes). In other words, the foxes were most common where the dingoes were least common. Subsequently, populations of an endangered prey species, the dusky hopping mouse (Notomys fuscus) were also less abundant where dingoes were absent due to the foxes, which consume the mice, no longer being held in check by the top predator.

Marine trophic cascades
In addition to the classic examples listed above, more recent examples of trophic cascades in marine ecosystems have been identified:
 An example of a cascade in a complex, open-ocean ecosystem occurred in the northwest Atlantic during the 1980s and 1990s. The removal of Atlantic cod (Gadus morhua) and other ground fishes by sustained overfishing resulted in increases in the abundance of the prey species for these ground fishes, particularly smaller forage fishes and invertebrates such as the northern snow crab (Chionoecetes opilio) and northern shrimp (Pandalus borealis). The increased abundance of these prey species altered the community of zooplankton that serve as food for smaller fishes and invertebrates as an indirect effect.
 A similar cascade, also involving the Atlantic cod, occurred in the Baltic Sea at the end of the 1980s. After a decline in Atlantic cod, the abundance of its main prey, the sprat (Sprattus sprattus), increased and the Baltic Sea ecosystem shifted from being dominated by cod into being dominated by sprat. The next level of trophic cascade was a decrease in the abundance of Pseudocalanus acuspes, a copepod which the sprat prey on.
 On Caribbean coral reefs, several species of angelfishes and parrotfishes eat species of sponges that lack chemical defenses. Removal of these sponge-eating fish species from reefs by fish-trapping and netting has resulted in a shift in the sponge community toward fast-growing sponge species that lack chemical defenses. These fast-growing sponge species are superior competitors for space, and overgrow and smother reef-building corals to a greater extent on overfished reefs.

See also 

 Cascade effect (ecology)
 Fishing down the food web
 Food web
 Lake ecology
 Mesopredator release hypothesis
 Population dynamics of fisheries
 Soil food web
 Stream ecology

References 

Trophic ecology